The following is a list of abbots and abbesses of Kildare, heads of Kildare Abbey, founded — according to tradition — by Saint Brigit.

List of abbesses
Brigit ingen Dubthaig, d. 1 February either 521, 524, or 526
Abbesses of unknown death year alleged to have followed Brigit
Der Lugdach, commemorated 1 February
Comnat, commemorated 1 January
Tuilclath, commemorated 6 January
Gnáthnat (or Gnáthat), d. 690
Sébdann ingen Cuirc, d. 732
Affraic (or Aiffrica), d. 743
Martha ingen maic Dubáin, d. 758
Lerthan, d. 773
Condál ingen Murchado, d. 797 
Fine, d. 805
Muirenn ingen Cellaig, d. 831
Affraic, d. 834 
Cathán, d. 855
Tuilelaith ingen Uargalaig, d. 10 January, 885
Cobflaith ingen Duib Dúin, d. 916
Muirenn ingen Suairt, d. 26 May, 918
Muirenn ingen Flannacáin meic Colmáin, d. 964 
Muirenn ingen Congalaig, d. 979 
Eithne ingen Suairt, d. 1016
Lann ingen meic Selbacháin, d. 1047 
Dub Dil, d. 1072
Gormlaith ingen Murchada, d. 1112
Ingen Cerbaill meic Fáeláin, deposed 1127
Mór ingen Domnaill Uí Chonchobair Failge, deposed 1132/d. 1167
Sadb ingen Glúniarain Meic Murchada, d. 1171

List of abbots
Áed Dub mac Colmáin, d. 639
Óengus mac Áedo Find, unknown dates
Brandub mac Fiachrach, unknown dates
Lóchéne Mend Sapines, d. 696
Do Dímmóc, d. march 3, 748 
Cathal mac Forindáin, d. 752
Muiredach mac Cathail, d. 787
Eódus ua Dícolla, d. 798
Fáelán mac Cellaig, d. 804
Muiredach mac Cellaig, d. 823
Áed mac Cellaig, d. 828
Siadal mac Feradaig, d. 830
Artrí mac Fáeláin, d. 852
Cellach mac Ailello, d. 865
Cobthach mac Muiredaig, d. 870
Muiredach mac Brain, d. 885
Tuathal mac Ailbi, d. 886
Dubán, d. 905
Flannacán ua Riacáin, d. 922
Cuilén mac Cellaig, d. 955
Muiredach mac Fáeláin, d. 967

References

Christianity in medieval Ireland
Kildare
 Kildare